Almost Never is a British musical drama series that premiered on CBBC on 15 January 2019. The series details the experiences of two fictional bands, the Wonderland and Girls Here First, following their appearance on the fictional music competition series The Spotlight. Almost Never stars Nathaniel Dass, Harry Still, Oakley Orchard, Mya-Lecia Naylor, Miriam Nyarko, Lola Moxom, Lilly Stanion, Kimberly Wyatt, Tillie Amartey, Tyra Richardson and Aston Merrygold. The series features numerous songs in each episode, with both cover versions of popular songs and original music written by cast and crew members of the series.

Soundtrack albums

Songs

References

Television soundtracks
2019 soundtrack albums
2020 soundtrack albums
2021 soundtrack albums
Lists of songs by work